Six days or Six Days or 6 Days may refer to:

Battles
Six-Day War (aka Third Arab–Israeli War) in 1967
Six-Day War (2000) in Kisangani, DRC
The Six Days' Campaign of Napoleon Bonaparte

Sports and games
International Six Days Enduro, enduro motorcycling competition with national teams
6 Day Race
Six Days in Fallujah, video game
Six-day racing, cycling event
Six Days of Ghent
Six Days of Grenoble

Film
6 Days, 2008 documentary film by Vincent Moon associated with the R.E.M. album Accelerate
6 Days (2017 film), 2017 action film by Toa Fraser and Glenn Standring about the 1980 Iranian Embassy siege in London
"Six Days" (Grey's Anatomy), a 2007 episode of Grey's Anatomy
Six Days (1923 film), a 1923 silent movie starring Corinne Griffith

Music
"Six Day War" (1971), Colonel Bagshot song
"Six Days" (song) (2002), DJ Shadow song
Six Days on the Road, song

Other
Hexameron, days of creation
Six Days by Jeremy Bowen

See also
The Sixth Day (disambiguation)